Patricia Javiera López Menadier (born July 10, 1977, Santiago) is a Chilean singer and actress of film, theater, and television. In 2012, she joined the cast of Reserva de familia.

Filmography

Telenovelas

Theatre

References

External links

1977 births
Actresses from Santiago
Singers from Santiago
21st-century Chilean women singers
Chilean film actresses
Chilean stage actresses
Chilean television actresses
Living people